Ceamurlia de Jos (meaning "Lower Ceamurlia") is a commune in the southeast of Tulcea County, Northern Dobruja, Romania. It has a total population of 2,620 and it has an area of 119,43 km². The Golovița Lake is located south of this commune. Its name is derived from Turkish Çamurlu, meaning "muddy".

A part of the inhabitants of this commune are Aromanians that were deported from Southern Dobruja, where they settled from the Southern Balkans during the Romanian rule of the region, after it was ceded back to Bulgaria in 1940 according to the terms of the Treaty of Craiova.

Ceamurlia de Jos commune is composed of two villages:

 Ceamurlia de Jos, with a population of 1,258 and an area of 1,69 km²
 Lunca, with a population of 1,362 and an area of 1,66 km², located 4 km east of the Ceamurlia de Jos village.

Ceamurlia de Jos was the place where the H5N1 strain of the avian influenza was found for the first time in Europe, being brought by migrating birds from Asia that passed through the nearby Danube Delta.

References

Communes in Tulcea County
Localities in Northern Dobruja
Place names of Turkish origin in Romania